Viramgam is a town and former princely state in the Indian state of Gujarat. The town is located in the Ahmedabad district, which contains the city of Ahmedabad, the state's largest city. Gateway Distriparks notably flagged off the first export train service from the newly built inland container depot (ICD) at Viramgam.

History

Recorded history 
Around 1090, Minaldevi, the mother of Jayasimha Siddharaja of Chaulukya dynasty who ruled from Anhilwad Patan, commissioned the Munsar lake. Siddhraj added several shrines and temples later. 

Under the strong Mandal chief, Viramgam did not become part of the Muslim Gujarat Sultanate until 1530. Commanding the entrance to Kathiawar, the Mughal governors chose it as the headquarters of the Jhalavad prant (district), and in the disturbances of the eighteenth century, it was the scene of several struggles.

Historical and legendary references 
According to Dr. Savliya, author of "Ancient lakes of Gujarat," one of the rooms on the Musar lake has ancient writing of the person who built this lake. That is believed to be a proof according to which it seems like this lake was built by King Viramdev Vaghela. In that writing, his wife's name is also there, Queen Sumla Devi.

According to another story, King Bhimdev II had given land on samvat 1295 of Ghusdi village (now known as Viramgam). That land is used for Musar lake.
Still today there is Ghusdiya lake and Ghusdiya ground in Viramgam which proves that earlier Viramgam was known as Ghusdi.

According to another story, Barbara Bhut (Ghost) who was a slave of King Siddhraj Jaysinh has built this lake in one night.

Lakes 
The town is surrounded by three reservoirs: the Gangasar lake on the south-east and south, lying outside of the wall except a small portion known as the Gusaria lake; in the south-west beyond the Gangasar gate the Dhunia lake; and in the west the Munsar lake.

Munsar lake 

Munsar lake was built about 1090 by Minaldevi, the mother of Siddhraj Jaisinh. Formerly known as Mansarovar, now shortened into Mansar or Munsar lake is 220 yards round, shaped like the conch and is surrounded by flights of stone steps. Gathering from the west, the water passes into a stone-built eight sided silt-well, kund, with, in a niche in each side, a figure cut in bold relief.

From the silt-well, through a stone-lined channel and a three-cylinder tunnel, the water passes into the lake. Over the tunnel is a large pyramid-roofed pavilion repaired by the Marathas, and a temple of Bahuchar Mata, or, as she is locally called, Mansar Mata. Towards the north the steps round the lake are ruinous, and in several places, broken roadways run down to the water's edge. Around the top of the steps runs a row of small spire-roofed shrines, many now wanting but once said to have numbered more than 300. In each shrine on one side of the lake is a pedestal, probably for an image of Krishna, and on the other side a round basin, jaladhar, probably sacred to Shiva. On either side of one of the roadways that run to the water's edge, is a larger temple with a double porch and spire and across the lake is a flat-roofed colonnade.

Gangasar lake 
The Gangasar lake was built eight hundred years ago by Sufi (Muslim mystic) saint Hazrat Alauddin Shah Chishty with help from Hazrat Islahuddin. He was born Hindu and his birth name was Gangu Vanjara. According to legend, he converted to Islam after watching miracles by Aladdin Shah. He built a lake at the request of Hazrat Aladdin Shah, which was named Gangasagar after his birth name Gangu Vanjara. The name later shortened to Gangasar.

Geography 
The old town of Viramgam is surrounded by a rectangular, tower flanked brick and stone wall, about 21 miles round.

In the wall are five gates: on the north, the Golwadi gate leading to Patan; on the north-east, the Bharwadi gate leading to the railway station; on the east, the Raipuri or Rayyapur gate leading to Ahmedabad; on the south-west, the Gangasar gate ; and on the west, the Mansar or Munsar gate.

There are also two unopened gateways on the north-west and north-east, and in the south face is a window through which water is drawn from the Gangasar lake.

Government 
The town is represented in the Gujarat Legislative Assembly in the Viramgam constituency. Since 2017, the constituency has been represented by Lakhabhai Bharwad of the Indian National Congress. Nationally, the town is apart of the Lok Sabha constituency of Surendranagar, which has been represented by Mahendra Munjapara of the Bharatiya Janata Party since 2019.

Connectivity/transportation

Air
The closest major airport to Viramgam is Sardar Vallabhbhai Patel International Airport (AMD / VAAH). It also provides many international flights from Ahmedabad to destinations around the world.

Rail
Viramgam is well connected to other major cities of the country via regular trains.

Railway Station(s): Viramgam Junction (VG)

Viramgam used to be the point of intersection of BB & CI Railway and the Saurashtra Railway. Viramgam is at the intersection of four railway lines: Ahmedabad-Viramgam, Viramgam-Surendranagar, Viramgam-Mehsana, and Viramgam-Dhrangdhra-Samakhyali lines. It is at the intersection of the routes splitting towards Kachchh and Saurashtra while travelling from Ahmedabad. It is also having Inland Container Depot (ICD) facility by Gateway Distriparks.

Road
Viramgam is connected to Ahmedabad, Kutch, Mumbai, New Delhi through the National Highway 947. The location is also connected to Saurashtra through the GJ SH 17.

Bus
Regular buses transit to Viramgam Bus Station from other major cities of the country.

Other industry
There is a crude oil storage tank depot at Viramgam on the Salya-Mathura oil pipeline of the Indian Oil Corporation.

Notable people
People who were born in, residents of, or otherwise closely associated with Viramgam include:
Dhiru Parikh (1933 – 2021), Gujarati writer and critic
Bhadreshkumar Chetanbhai Patel (born 1990), alleged murderer and fugitive on the FBI Ten Most Wanted Fugitives list
 Sanjay Thaker

References 

Cities and towns in Ahmedabad district